Sir Roger Tuckfield Goldsworthy  (1839 – 6 May 1900) was a British colonial administrator.

Roger Goldsworthy was born in Marylebone, Middlesex in 1839, and educated at Sandhurst, the younger brother of Major-General Walter Tuckfield Goldsworthy MP (1837–1911). He joined his father and brother in Calcutta in 1855 and later joined the volunteer cavalry known as Havelock's Irregulars. During the Indian rebellion of 1857 he won medals and was mentioned in dispatches. In 1859 he was commissioned as a lieutenant in the 17th Lancers. He resigned in 1866.

From 1868 to 1870, Goldsworthy was Inspector General of Police in Sierra Leone; during this time he married a widow named Eliza Egan. He was then commandant of the Hausa Armed Police and District Magistrate of Lagos until 1873. He then became Inspector of Customs for the Gold Coast until 1874. In 1874 he was made CMG for his role in the war with the Akumahs. His next appointment was as President of Nevis from 1876 to 1877.

In 1877, Goldsworthy was appointed Colonial Secretary of Western Australia, a position which also implied an appointment to the Western Australian Legislative Council. He took up both appointments on 30 August 1877, holding them until his resignation on 7 September 1880. Following this, he was Administrator and Colonial Secretary of Saint Lucia from 1881 to 1884; Governor and Commander-in-Chief of the British Honduras from 1884 to 1891; and Governor of the Falkland Islands from 1891 to 1897.

Goldsworthy was made KCMG in 1889. He died on 6 May 1900.

References
 
 Goldsworthy family, pers. comm.

1839 births
1900 deaths
17th Lancers officers
British military personnel of the Indian Rebellion of 1857
Colonial Service officers
British colonial police officers
Colonial Secretaries of Western Australia
Governors of British Honduras
Governors of the Falkland Islands
Members of the Western Australian Legislative Council
People from Marylebone
Knights Commander of the Order of St Michael and St George
Governors of British Saint Lucia
Governors of British Grenada
Governors of Nevis
19th-century Australian politicians